Tyc or TYC may refer to:
 Texas Youth Commission
 Tibetan Youth Congress
 Thomas Young Centre
 Torneos y Competencias, abbreviated as TyC
 Tycho Catalogue of stars, associated with the Hipparcos Catalogue

People 
 Jakub Tyc (born 1992), Polish figure skater
 Roman Týc (born 1974), Czech street artist
 Wojciech Tyc (born 1955), Polish footballer